Dekh Magar Pyaar Say is a 2015 Pakistani romantic comedy film directed by Asad ul Haq and produced by Ali Murtaza  under the production banner Shiny Toy Guns. The film was the directorial debut for Haq. The movie starred Humaima Malick and Sikander Rizvi in the lead roles. The latter made his film debut with the movie.

Dekh Magar Pyar Se received positive reviews for good direction, acting and praise for its music. The cinematography was especially lauded as it showcased  the beauty of Lahore.

Cast 
Humaima Malick as Annie
Sikander Rizvi as Sikandar
Irfan Khoosat
Amna Ilyas - Special appearance in song "Kaala Doriya"

Production 
The film was produced, financed and developed by Shiny Toy Guns. The styling for the movie was done by Saima Rashid Bargfrede. Shehryar Yasin was hired as the Creative and Fashion Design Director for the movie.

Casting
On 2 April 2015 Humaima Malick and Sikander Rizvi were confirmed as the lead actors. Amna Ilyas was cast for an item song "Kaala Doriya".

Filming
The film was mostly shot in Lahore over a 45-day period with filming wrapping up in the week of 18 May. The cast and crew were spotted in London shooting scenes for the movie. The cast and crew were reportedly filming bonus footage for the movie in London.

Marketing
On 2 April 2015 the first teaser poster for the movie was released. Motion poster was revealed on 2 June. The teaser trailer for the movie was released on 1 July via the movie's official Facebook page. To promote the movie, fans were given the opportunity to view the filming of the bonus footage being shot in London via the Periscope app. The movie was also promoted using the hashtag "magarpyaarsay". The theatrical trailer was revealed online on 12 July 2015.

Soundtrack

The background score of the film was given by Abbas Ali Khan.

Reception 
Dekh Magar Pyar Se received positive reviews with good directing and acting while praising its music.

See also
 List of Pakistani films of 2015

References

External links 
 
 

2015 films
2015 romantic comedy films
Pakistani romantic comedy films
Films scored by Mooroo
Films shot in Lahore
Films shot in London
Films set in Lahore
Films set in London
2015 directorial debut films